Andrew Julius (born 20 July 1984) is an international footballer from Montserrat who plays as a midfielder.

Career

Club career
After playing youth football with Crystal Palace, Julius moved on loan to Bromley in January 2003, and left Palace without making an appearance in the Football League for them. After playing with Barnet, Crawley Town, 
Hertford Town, Braintree Town, and Erith & Belvedere, Julius joined Redbridge in November 2004. Julius later re-joined Bromley, and was released by them in October 2005. After a spell with Kingstonian, Julius rejoined Redbridge in February 2006.

International career
Julius made his international debut for Montserrat on 26 March 2008, in a FIFA World Cup qualifier, and has three caps to date.

References

1984 births
Living people
British people of Montserratian descent
Montserratian footballers
Montserrat international footballers
Crystal Palace F.C. players
Bromley F.C. players
Erith & Belvedere F.C. players
Braintree Town F.C. players
Hertford Town F.C. players
Crawley Town F.C. players
Barnet F.C. players
Kingstonian F.C. players
Redbridge F.C. players
Association football midfielders